The Magic Pen of Joseph Clement Coll is a study of American illustrator Joseph Clement Coll by Walt Reed.  It was first published by Donald M. Grant, Publisher, Inc. in 1978 in an edition of 750 copies, all of which were numbered and signed by the author.

References

1978 non-fiction books
American non-fiction books
Art history books
Case studies
Donald M. Grant, Publisher books